Ekeby is a populated area, a socken (not to be confused with parish), on the Swedish island of Gotland. It comprises the same area as the administrative Ekeby District, established on 1January 2016.

Geography 
Ekeby is situated in the northern central part of Gotland. The medieval Ekeby Church is located in the socken. , Ekeby Church belongs to Dalhem parish in Romaklosters pastorat, along with the churches in Dalhem, Ganthem and Hörsne.

References

External links 

Objects from Ekeby at the Digital Museum by Nordic Museum

Populated places in Gotland County